The klipspringer (Oreotragus oreotragus) is a small antelope found in eastern and southern Africa. The sole member of its genus and subfamily/tribe, the klipspringer was first described by German zoologist Eberhard August Wilhelm von Zimmermann in 1783. The coat of the klipspringer, yellowish gray to reddish brown, acts as an efficient camouflage in its rocky habitat. Unlike most other antelopes, the klipspringer has a thick and coarse coat with hollow, brittle hairs. The horns, short and spiky, typically measure .

Typically nocturnal, the klipspringer rests during the middle of the day and late at night. A gregarious animal, the klipspringer is monogamous to a much greater extent than other antelopes; individuals of opposite sexes exhibit long-term to lifelong pair bonding. The mates tend to stay as close as within  of each other at most times. Males form territories, in which they stay with their partners and offspring. Primarily a browser, the klipspringer prefers young plants, fruits and flowers. Gestation lasts around six months, following which a single calf is born; births peak from spring to early summer. The calf leaves its mother when it turns a year old.

The klipspringer inhabits places characterised by rocky terrain and sparse vegetation. Its range extends from northeastern Sudan, Eritrea, Somaliland and Ethiopia in the east to South Africa in the south, and along coastal Angola and Namibia. The International Union for the Conservation of Nature and Natural Resources (IUCN) classifies the klipspringer as Least Concern. There are no major threats to the survival of the klipspringer, as its habitat is inaccessible and unfavourable for hunting. Significant numbers occur on private farmlands. As of 2008, nearly 25% of the populations occur in protected areas throughout its range.

Taxonomy and etymology

The scientific name of the klipspringer is Oreotragus oreotragus , from Greek ὄρος (óros), "mountain", and τράγος (trágos), "he-goat". It is the sole member of the genus Oreotragus and subfamily Oreotraginae or tribe Oreotragini, and is classified under the family Bovidae. The species was first described by German zoologist Eberhard August Wilhelm von Zimmermann in 1783. The vernacular name "klipspringer" is a compound of the Afrikaans words klip ("rock") and springer ("leaper"). Another name for this antelope is "klipbok".

A 2012 phylogenetic study showed that the klipspringer is closely related to Kirk's dik-dik (Madoqua kirkii) and the suni (Neotragus moschatus). The klipspringer evolved nearly 14 million years ago. The cladogram below is based on this study.

As many as 11 subspecies have been identified, though zoologists Colin Groves and Peter Grubb treat a few of them as independent species in a 2011 publication:

O. o. aceratos Noack, 1899 : Noack's or southern Tanzanian klipspringer. Occurs in eastern and southern Africa, between rivers Rufiji and Zambezi.
O. o. aureus Heller, 1913 : Golden klipspringer. Occurs in Kenya.
O. o. centralis Hinton, 1921 : Zambian klipspringer. Occurs in central and southern Africa.
O. o. oreotragus (Zimmermann, 1783) : Cape klipspringer. Occurs in the Cape of Good Hope, South Africa.
O. o. porteousi Lydekker, 1911 : Occurs in central Africa.
O. o. saltatrixoides (Temminck, 1853) : Ethiopian klipspringer. Occurs in the highlands of Ethiopia.
O. o. schillingsi Neumann, 1902 : Maasai klipspringer. Occurs in eastern Africa.
O. o. somalicus Neumann, 1902 : Somali klipspringer. Occurs in northern Somalia.
O. o. stevensoni Roberts, 1946 : Stevenson's klipspringer. Occurs in western Zimbabwe.
O. o. transvaalensis Roberts, 1917 : Transvaal klipspringer. Occurs in South African highlands and Drakensberg.
O. o. tyleri Hinton, 1921 : Angolan klipspringer. Occurs in Namibia.

Description
 
The klipspringer is a small, sturdy antelope reaching  at the shoulder. The klipspringer is sexually dimorphic; females are slightly larger and heavier than the males. The tail measures . Prominent facial features include the brown forehead, short ears marked with black, prominent preorbital glands near the eyes, and white lips and chin.

The coat of the klipspringer, yellowish gray to reddish brown, acts as an efficient camouflage in its rocky habitat; the underbelly is white. Unlike most other antelopes, the klipspringer has a thick and coarse coat with hollow, brittle hairs. The incisors might even get damaged by the hairs while grooming. However, the coat is a significant adaptation that saves the animal during steep falls and provides effective insulation in the extreme climates characteristic of its mountain habitat. A study showed that ticks occur in larger numbers on the underbelly, where the hair is less coarse. The hair often turns erect, especially if the animal is ill or if its temperature increases. Another feature unique to the klipspringer is its gait; it walks on the tips of its cylindrical, blunt hooves. This enhances the grip on the ground, enabling the animal to deftly climb and jump over rocky surfaces.

The subspecies vary in coat colour – from golden yellow in the Cape klipspringer, Ethiopian klipspringer, golden klipspringer and Transvaal klipspringer to ochre or rufous in the Maasai klipspringer, Stevenson's klipspringer and Zambian klipspringer. Cape klipspringer populations tend to have the largest males, while Maasai klipspringer exhibit the largest females.

Ecology and behaviour

Typically nocturnal (active mainly at night), the klipspringer rests during the midday and at late night; the animal tends to be more active on moonlit nights. It basks in the morning sunlight to warm itself. A gregarious animal, the klipspringer, like the dik-diks and the oribi, exhibits monogamy to a much greater extent than other antelopes; individuals of opposite sexes form pairs that might last until one dies. The mates tend to stay as close as within  of each other at most times; for instance, they take turns at keeping a lookout for predators while the other feeds, and face any danger together. The klipspringer will hop a few metres away from the danger. Other social groups include small family herds of 8 or more members or solitary individuals. Klipspringer greet one another by rubbing cheeks at social meetings.

Males form territories,  large (the size depends on rainfall patterns), in which they stay with their partners and offspring. Males are generally more vigilant than females. A study revealed that the tick Ixodes neitzi detects and aggregates on twigs marked by the klipspringer. Another study showed that plants near the borders with neighbouring territories are particularly preferred for marking. The main vocalisation is a shrill whistle, given out by the klipspringer pair in a duet, as a means of communication or anti-predator response. Predators include the baboon, black-backed jackal, caracal, crowned eagle, leopard, martial eagle, serval, spotted hyena and Verreaux's eagle. Birds such as familiar chats, pale-winged starlings, red-winged starlings and yellow-bellied bulbuls have been observed feeding on ectoparasites of klipspringer.

Diet
Primarily a browser, the klipspringer prefers young plants, fruits and flowers. Grasses, eaten mainly in the wet season, form a minor portion of the diet. Some plants, such as Vellozia, may be preferred seasonally. Klipspringer depend mainly on succulent plants, and not on water bodies, to meet their water requirement.

Reproduction
The klipspringer is a seasonal breeder; the time when mating occurs varies geographically. Females become sexually mature by the time they are a year old; males take slightly longer to mature. Mating behaviour has not been extensively observed. Births take place in dense vegetation. The newborn is carefully hidden for up to three months to protect it from the view of predators; the mother suckles it three to four times a day, the visits gradually lengthen as the offspring grows. Males are protective of their offspring, keeping a watch for other males and predators. The calf is weaned at four to five months, and leaves its mother when it turns a year old. The klipspringer lives for around 15 years.

Habitat and distribution

The klipspringer inhabits places characterised by rocky terrain and sparse vegetation. It migrates to lowlands at times of food scarcity. The klipspringer can occur at high population densities in favourable habitats extending over a large area; 10 to 14 individuals occur per square kilometre in the Simien Mountains National Park, Ethiopia. However, the habitat is typically rocky over long stretches and grassy terrain is discontinuous; consequently the population density is typically between 0.01 and 0.1 individual per square kilometre.

The antelope occurs in significant numbers across eastern and southern Africa; its range extends from northeastern Sudan, Eritrea, northern Somalia and Ethiopia in the east to South Africa in the south, and along coastal Angola and Namibia. Smaller populations occur in the northern and western highlands of Central African Republic, southeastern Democratic Republic of Congo, Jos Plateau and east of Gashaka Gumti National Park in Nigeria. It is feared to be extinct in Burundi.

Threats and conservation

The International Union for the Conservation of Nature and Natural Resources (IUCN) classifies the klipspringer as Least Concern. The klipspringer is hunted for its meat, leather and hair. However, there are no major threats to the survival of the klipspringer, as its habitat is inaccessible and unfavourable for hunting. Moreover, the antelope does not have to compete with livestock, that do not frequent montane areas. However, populations at lower altitudes are more vulnerable to elimination.

In 1999, Rod East of the IUCN SSC Antelope Specialist Group estimated the total population of klipspringer at 42,000. Significant numbers occur on private farmlands. As of 2008, nearly 25% of the populations occur in protected areas such as the Simien and Bale Mountains National Parks (Ethiopia); Tsavo East and West National Parks (Kenya); North and South Luangwa National Parks (Zambia); Nyika National Park (Malawi); Namib-Naukluft National Park (Namibia); and Matobo National Park (Zimbabwe).

References

External links

Dwarf antelopes
Mammals of Botswana
Mammals of South Africa
Mammals of Ethiopia
Mammals of Namibia
Mammals of Sudan
Mammals of Angola
Fauna of East Africa
Mammals of Kenya
Mammals of Tanzania
Mammals of Zambia
Mammals of Uganda
Afrikaans words and phrases
Mammals described in 1783
Mammals of the Central African Republic
Mammals of the Democratic Republic of the Congo
Mammals of Djibouti
Mammals of Eritrea
Mammals of Malawi
Mammals of Mozambique
Mammals of West Africa
Mammals of Rwanda
Mammals of Somalia
Mammals of South Sudan
Mammals of Eswatini
Mammals of Zimbabwe
Taxa named by Eberhard August Wilhelm von Zimmermann